François Trinh-Duc (born 11 November 1986) is a French rugby union player for Union Bordeaux Bègles in France's top division of rugby union, the Top 14. Trinh-Duc's regular position is at fly-half or inside centre.

Biography
Trinh-Duc was born in Montpellier.

Trinh-Duc started playing rugby at the age of 4 at the Pic-Saint-Loup rugby school near his native city. There, he played with his future Montpellier team-mate Fulgence Ouedraogo. They both entered the club's youth teams at "Cadet" level (U-13/14) and are said to be inseparable friends.

With fellow Montpelliérains Louis Picamoles and Julien Tomas, they are part of a quartet of home-grown talents embodying the success of the Montpellier Hérault Rugby Club's attempt at "shaking up the old order" of French rugby in the Septimanie terroir which had always been historical rival Béziers's stronghold.

Trinh-Duc was called up by Marc Lièvremont to the France squad for the 2008 Six Nations Championship, and has played in all of France's matches in the competition to date.

Trinh-Duc's drop goal helped France beat England 19–12 at Eden Park in quarter final in 2011 Rugby World Cup. He came on as a substitute for the injured Morgan Parra in the 23rd minute of the final against New Zealand. He set in motion the move that led to Thierry Dusautoir's try in the 47th minute and converted the try to make the score 8–7. With 15 minutes remaining and the score still at 8–7, France were awarded a penalty to put them in front for the first time, but Trinh-Duc's 48m penalty attempt was wide off the mark and the All Blacks went on to win the final.

On 19 March 2021, Trinh Duc left Racing 92 for Top 14 rivals Bordeaux from the 2021–22 season.

Personal life
Trinh-Duc was noted as one of the first ever rugby players of Vietnamese origin to play for the French national side. His paternal grandfather, Trịnh Đức Nhiên, was born in French Indochina, migrated to France during the Second World War right after the Liberation of France, and settled near Agen in Lot-et-Garonne. Nhien later married an Italian woman;  Trinh-Duc's father, Philippe, being the result of this union.

International tries

Footnotes

References

External links

FFR profile 
Montpellier Hérault RC profile 

1986 births
Living people
Sportspeople from Montpellier
French rugby union players
French people of Vietnamese descent
Sportspeople of Vietnamese descent
French people of Italian descent
Rugby union fly-halves
Montpellier Hérault Rugby players
RC Toulonnais players
Racing 92 players
France international rugby union players